Yuliya Viktorovna Martisova (also Julia Martisova, ; born 15 June 1976 in Velikiye Luki, Pskov Oblast) is a Russian professional road cyclist. She has awarded two Russian championship titles (2005 and 2008) in the women's road race, and later represented her nation Russia at the 2008 Summer Olympics. Martisova currently races for Italy's  pro cycling team during the 2013 annual season.

Racing career
Since her professional debut in 2000, Martisova made the worldwide headlines in her sporting career, following her tremendous success in the women's road race at the 2005 Russian Championships. Strong results landed her spot on the P.M.B. Fenix Cycling Team in Italy under an exclusive three-year contract, and eventually added another title in her career hardware from the seventh stage of Tour De L'Aude Cycliste Féminin in Languedoc-Roussillon, France. When her contract with Fenix expired shortly, Martisova transferred to Gauss RDZ-Ormu pro cycling team in 2008, and stayed for four consecutive seasons. Furthermore, she recaptured her title in the same category at the Russian Championships on the same year.

Martisova qualified for the Russian squad in the women's road race at the 2008 Summer Olympics in Beijing by receiving one of the nation's three available berths from the UCI World Cup. She scored a career-high, twelfth place as the top Russian cyclist on a grueling race against sixty-five other riders in 3:32:45, finishing more than twenty-one seconds behind Olympic champion Nicole Cooke of Great Britain.

At the 2011 UCI Road World Championships, Martisova could not chase four other riders from the leading group on the final lap, as she sprinted towards the finish line with a fifth-place effort in 3:21:28, narrowly missing out the podium by a short distance.

In 2012, Martisova renounced her membership in Gauss, and instead signed a one-year exclusive contract with Italy's BePink ladies' cycling team.

Career highlights

2000
 2nd Stage 3, Grande Boucle Féminine Internationale, France
 3rd Russian Championships (Road), Russia
2001
 2nd Overall, Trophée d'Or Féminin, France
 1st Stage 1
2002
 2nd Stage 5, Giro d'Italia Donne, Italy
 3rd Stage 3, Giro d'Italia Donne, Italy
2005
 1st  Russian Championships (Road), Russia
 1st Stage 7, Tour De L'Aude Cycliste Féminin, Languedoc-Roussillon (FRA)
 2nd Stage 2, Tour de l'Ardèche, Beauchastel (FRA)
 2nd Stage 3, Tour De L'Aude Cycliste Féminin, Languedoc-Roussillon (FRA)
 3rd Stage 1b, Tour de l'Ardèche, Cruas (FRA)
 3rd Stage 3b Giro della Toscana Int. Femminile – Memorial Michela Fanini, Campi Bisenzio (ITA)
 3rd Stage 4, Tour de l'Ardèche, Bourg-Saint-Andéol (FRA)
2008
 1st  Russian Championships (Road), Russia
 3rd Overall, Tour Féminin en Limousin, France
 1st Stage 3, Lauriere
 10th UCI World Championships (Road), Varese (ITA) 
 59th Olympic Games (Road), Beijing (CHN)
2009
 3rd Stage 6, Giro della Toscana Int. Femminile, Firenze (ITA)
 4th Stage 2, Giro della Toscana Int. Femminile, Altopascio (ITA)
 6th Prologue, Route de France Féminine, Chaix (FRA)
 3rd Stage 5, Châtelguyon
 4th Stage 1, Cholet
 4th Stage 2, Cholet
 6th Stage 3, Vierzon
 7th Stage 9, Giro d'Italia Donne, Grumo Nevano (ITA)
2010
 2nd Russian Championships (Road), Cheboksary (RUS)
 2nd Stage 6, Tour De L'Aude Cycliste Féminin, Languedoc-Roussillon (FRA)
 3rd Stage 1, Trophée d'Or Féminin, Mehun-sur-Yèvre (FRA)
 3rd Stage 3, Trophée d'Or Féminin, Avord (FRA)
 5th Stage 3, Thüringen Rundfahrt der Frauen, Greiz (GER)
 5th Stage 8, Tour De L'Aude Cycliste Féminin, Limoux (FRA)
 5th Stage 9, Tour De L'Aude Cycliste Féminin, Languedoc-Roussillon (FRA)
 8th Stage 2, Giro d'Italia Donne, Riese Pio X (ITA)
 8th Stage 5, Thüringen Rundfahrt der Frauen, Schmölln (GER)
 9th Stage 2, Thüringen Rundfahrt der Frauen, Gera (GER)
 10th Stage 2, Giro della Toscana Int. Femminile, Altopascio (ITA)
2011
 3rd Stage 1, Tour de l'Ardèche, Beauchastel (FRA)
 3rd Stage 3, Tour de l'Ardèche, Le Teil (FRA)
 5th UCI World Championships (Road), Copenhagen (DEN) 
 5th Stage 2, Giro della Toscana Int. Femminile, Altopascio (ITA)
 5th Stage 5, Giro d'Italia Donne, Verona (ITA)
 7th Stage 6, Giro d'Italia Donne, Piacenza (ITA)
2012
 5th Stage 4, Trophée d'Or Féminin, Cosne-sur-Loire (FRA)
 8th Overall, Tour of Adygeya, Russia
 1st Stage 1, Maykop
 4th Stage 3, Maykop
 10th Stage 1, Giro della Toscana Int. Femminile, Viareggio (ITA)
2013
 10th Overall, Tour of Chongming Island World Cup, China

References

External links
NBC 2008 Olympics profile

1976 births
Living people
People from Velikiye Luki
Russian female cyclists
Cyclists at the 2008 Summer Olympics
Olympic cyclists of Russia
Sportspeople from Pskov Oblast